Semenelin is the second full-length studio album by Filipino rock band Wolfgang. The record is their first release under Epic Records, a division under Sony Music Entertainment after leaving Ivory Records.

Accolades

* denotes an unordered list

Track listing

Personnel 
Sebastian "Basti" Artadi (vocals), additional percussions (track 13)
Manuel Legarda (guitar), backing vocals (track 3)
Ramon "Mon" Legaspi (bass)
Leslie "Wolf" Gemora (drums)

All Songs are written and arranged by Wolfgang except Blue 11 By Manuel Legarda

Additional Musician
Jay Ignacio - Laughter (track 2)
Perfecto De Castro - Backing Vocals (track 3)
Perfecto De Castro, Diego Garrido - Cello (track 10)
Perfecto De Castro, David Aguirre, Tirso Ripoll - Extra Musicians on "Roadworthy Man"
Joey of Saga - Backing Vocals (track 11)
Brian Velasco, Wam, Toni - Additional Percussion (track 13)

Album Credits 
Executive Producer: Mony Romana
Producer: Perfecto De Castro
Engineer: Diego Carrido
Assistant Engineer: Wam
Mixed By: Diego Garrido & Perfecto De Castro
Mastered By: Dennis Cham
Recorded at: HIT Productions (some vocal tracks are recorded at Perfecto Music Studio)
Photography By: Christina Castillo, Jay Ignacio
Album Art/Single Art: Miguel Mari & Allan Klar
Sleeve Design: Joni Lu & Carlos Hubilla
Typesetting & Layout: Chris Guodotti
Art Direction & Design: Miguel Mari

Videos 
Weightless

References

External links 
Wolfgang Website
Wolfgang Discography

1996 albums
Wolfgang (band) albums